Hydrelliinae is a subfamily of shore flies in the family Ephydridae.

Genera
Tribe Atissini  Cresson, 1942
Asmeringa Becker, 1903
Atissa Haliday, 1839
Cerobothrium Frey, 1958
Isgamera Soika, 1956
Pelignellus Sturtevant & Wheeler, 1954
Ptilomyia Coquillett, 1900
Schema Becker, 1907
Subpelignus Papp, 1983
Tribe Dryxini Zatwarnicki, 1992
Dryxo Robineau-Desvoidy, 1830
Oedenopiforma Cogan, 1968
Oedenops Becker, 1903
Omyxa Mathis & Zatwarnicki, 2002
Papuama Mathis & Zatwarnicki, 2002
Paralimna Loew, 1862
Tribe Hydrelliini
Lemnaphila Cresson, 1933 (duckweed miner flies)
Hydrellia Robineau-Desvoidy, 1830
Tribe Notiphilini Cresson, 1946
Notiphila Fallén, 1810
Dichaeta Meigen, 1830
Tribe Typopsilopini
Typopsilopa Cresson, 1916

Unplaced
Donaceus Cresson, 1943

References

Ephydridae
Articles created by Qbugbot
Brachycera subfamilies